The Journal of Time Series Analysis is a bimonthly peer-reviewed academic journal covering mathematical statistics as it relates to the analysis of time series data. It was established in 1980 and is published by John Wiley & Sons. The editor-in-chief is Robert Taylor (University of Essex). According to the Journal Citation Reports, the journal has a 2021 impact factor of 1.208, ranking it 94th out of 108 journals in the category "Mathematics, Interdisciplinary Applications" and 88th out of 125 in the category "Statistics & Probability".

References

External links

Statistics journals
Probability journals
Wiley (publisher) academic journals
Publications established in 1980
Bimonthly journals
English-language journals
Time series